European route E 821 is a European B class road in Italy, connecting the cities Rome – San Cesareo.

Route 
 
 E35, E80 Rome
 E45 San Cesareo

External links 
 UN Economic Commission for Europe: Overall Map of E-road Network (2007)
 International E-road network

International E-road network
Roads in Italy